Bromus tomentellus, the wooly brome, is a species of flowering plant in the family Poaceae, native to Crete, Turkey, the Caucusus, the Levant, Iraq, Iran, and Turkmenistan. It is a regionally important livestock forage species.

References

tomentellus
Forages
Flora of Crete
Flora of Turkey
Flora of Lebanon
Flora of Syria
Flora of Palestine (region)
Flora of Iraq
Flora of Iran
Flora of the Caucasus
Flora of Turkmenistan
Plants described in 1846